In mathematics, a thick set is a set of integers that contains arbitrarily long intervals. That is, given a thick set , for every , there is some  such that .

Examples
Trivially  is a thick set.  Other well-known sets that are thick include non-primes and non-squares.  Thick sets can also be sparse, for example:

Generalisations
The notion of a thick set can also be defined more generally for a semigroup, as follows.

It can be verified that when the semigroup under consideration is the natural numbers  with the addition operation , this definition is equivalent to the one given above.

See also
 Cofinal (mathematics)
 Cofiniteness
 Ergodic Ramsey theory
 Piecewise syndetic set
 Syndetic set

References 
 J. McLeod, "Some Notions of Size in Partial Semigroups", Topology Proceedings, Vol. 25 (Summer 2000), pp. 317-332.
 Vitaly Bergelson, "Minimal Idempotents and Ergodic Ramsey Theory", Topics in Dynamics and Ergodic Theory 8-39, London Math. Soc. Lecture Note Series 310, Cambridge Univ. Press, Cambridge, (2003)
 Vitaly Bergelson, N. Hindman, "Partition regular structures contained in large sets are abundant", Journal of Combinatorial Theory, Series A 93 (2001), pp. 18-36
 N. Hindman, D. Strauss. Algebra in the Stone-Čech Compactification. p104, Def. 4.45.

Semigroup theory
Ergodic theory